Syndecan-4 is a protein that in humans is encoded by the SDC4 gene.  Syndecan-4 is one of the four vertebrate syndecans and has a molecular weight of ~20 kDa.  Syndecans are the best-characterized plasma membrane proteoglycans.  Their intracellular domain of membrane-spanning core protein interacts with actin cytoskeleton and signaling molecules in the cell cortex.  Syndecans are normally found on the cell surface of fibroblasts and epithelial cells.  Syndecans interact with fibronectin on the cell surface, cytoskeletal and signaling proteins inside the cell to modulate the function of integrin in cell-matrix adhesion.  Also, syndecans bind to FGFs and bring them to the FGF receptor on the same cell.  As a co-receptor or regulator, mutated certain proteoglycans could cause severe developmental defects, like disordered distribution or inactivation of signaling molecules.

Syndecans have similar structural features: 
Attach to heparan sulfate chains – interacting factors (e.g. Matrix molecules, growth factors, and enzymes)
Chondroitin sulfate chain
Transmembrane domain – self-association
C1 domain – actin-association cytoskeleton
Variable domain – syndecan-specific
C2 domain – attach to PDZ proteins

Syndecans normally form homodimers or multimers.  Their biological function includes cell growth regulation, differentiation, and adhesion.
Syndecan-4 has more widespread distribution than other syndecans and it is the only syndecan that has been found consistently in focal adhesions.

Gene 
Syndecan-4 is also called ryudocan or amphiglycan.  It is found on chromosome 20, while a pseudogene has been found on chromosome 22. Syndecan-4 is one of the four vertebrate syndecans and has a molecular weight of ~20 kDa.  It has more widespread distribution than other syndecans, and it is the only syndecan that has been found consistently in focal adhesions.

Function 
Syndecan-4 is a transmembrane (type I) heparan sulfate proteoglycan that functions as a receptor in intracellular signaling. The protein is found as a homodimer and is a member of the syndecan proteoglycan family. Syndecan-4 interacts with extracellular matrix, anticoagulants, and growth-factors.  It also regulates the actin cytoskeleton, cell adhesion, and cell migration.

Syndecan-4 activates protein kinase C (PKC), an enzyme involved in signal transduction.  The variable domain of syndecan-4 could be a site of self-association.  The degree of oligomerization correlates with the activity of kinases, so the degree of clustering of syndecan-4 correlates to PKC activity.  Syndecan-4 also binds to phosphatidylinositol (4,5)-bisphosphate (PIP2) through the variable domain and increases PKC activity ten-fold.

Syndecan-4 is also a regulator of fibroblast growth factor-2 (FGF-2) signaling.  Syndecan-4 binds to FGF and mediates interaction with the FGF receptor.  Because the tight correlation between syndecan-4 and growth factors, the efficiency of angiogenic therapies have been thought to relate to syndecan-4.  Growth factor signaling may be disrupted by changes in syndecan-4 expression.  The cellular uptake, trafficking, and nuclear localization of FGF-2 could be increased by co-delivery of syndecan-4 proteoliposomes.  These alterations should be considered in FGF-2-based therapies.

Syndecan-4 is also associated with the healing process.  Lack of Sdc4 gene causes delayed wound healing in mice.  This delay may be due to compromised fibroblast motility.

Clinical significance

Endometriosis
Syndecan-4 expression is upregulated in the endometrium of women suffering from endometriosis, and its downregulation in endometriotic cells results in a decrease of invasive growth, and reduced expression of the small GTPase Rac1, Activating transcription factor 2 (ATF2), and MMP3.

Osteoarthritis
Syndecan-4 is upregulated in osteoarthritis and inhibition of syndecan-4 reduces cartilage destruction in mouse models of OA.

See Sindecán-4 at the Spanish Wikipedia

References

Further reading

External links